Catherine Street Historic District, also known as the North 9th St. Historic District, is a national historic district located at Noblesville, Hamilton County, Indiana.   It encompasses 50 contributing buildings and 1 contributing site in a predominantly residential section of Noblesville. It developed between about 1870 and 1937, and includes notable examples of Queen Anne, Italianate, and Bungalow / American Craftsman style architecture. Located in the district is the separately listed Dr. Samuel Harrell House.

It was listed on the National Register of Historic Places in 2001.

References

Historic districts on the National Register of Historic Places in Indiana
Queen Anne architecture in Indiana
Italianate architecture in Indiana
Historic districts in Hamilton County, Indiana
National Register of Historic Places in Hamilton County, Indiana
2001 establishments in Indiana